Gravity is a software program designed by Steve Safarik to simulate the motions of planetary bodies in space.  Users can create solar systems of up to 16 bodies. Mass, Density, Initial position, and Initial velocity can be varied by user input.  The bodies are then plotted as they move according to the laws of gravitation. Simulation settings may saved as files with the extension ".GRV"

Minimum requirements 

IBM compatible personal computer
Graphics display (Hercules, CGA, EGA, VGA, 8514/a)
Disk drive (Floppy or Hard)
At least 384K free memory
A math coprocessor (80x87).

References 

Science software for Windows
Windows-only shareware
Astronomy software